Gjerstad may refer to:

Places

Norway
 Gjerstad, a municipality in Agder county
 Gjerstad (village), the administrative centre of the municipality of Gjerstad in Agder county
 Gjerstad Church, a church in the municipality of Gjerstad in Agder county
 Gjerstad Station, a railway station on the Sørlandet Line located in the municipality of Gjerstad in Agder county
 Gjerstad, Vestland, a village in the municipality of Osterøy in Vestland county
 Gjerstad Church (Osterøy), a church in Osterøy municipality in Vestland county
 Gjerstad, Nordland, a village in the municipality of Hadsel in Nordland county

People
 Einar Gjerstad (1897–1988), a Swedish archaeologist
 Frode Gjerstad (born 1948), a Norwegian Jazz musician
 Ingunn Gjerstad (born 1963), a Norwegian politician
 Joralf Gjerstad (1926–2021), a Norwegian healer